Israeli annual Hebrew song chart (Hebrew: מצעד הפזמונים העברי השנתי) (Mitz'ad hapizmonim) is an annual Israeli Hebrew song contest.

History
Mitz'ad hapizmonim has been broadcast every year since 1963. 

There are two Hebrew song chart contests - one on the radio channel Reshet Gimmel and the other on the radio channel Galgalatz which is operated by the Israel Defense Forces Radio. The aim of these charts is to summarize all weekly charts aired throughout the last year. This charts consists of the most played songs of the year, the first place winner song is announced "Song of the Year". In addition, selected winners in several categories are also announced: "Male singer of the Year", "Female singer of the year", "Band of the Year" and "Breakthrough of the Year". The top songs and performers are determined by the votes of the listeners.

Winners

Kol Yisrael

See also
Music of Israel

References

Israeli record charts
Israeli music-related lists
Music competitions in Israel